Fello Star de Labé is a Guinean football club based in Labé. Their home games are played at Stade Saïfoulaye Diallo. Its logo and uniform colors are blue and black.

Achievements

National

Guinée Championnat National: 4
Winner: 2004 (championship cancelled due to financial problems), 2006, 2008, 2009, 2010

Guinée Coupe Nationale: 2
Winner: 2000, 2004

Guinée Super Coupe: 2
Winner: 2007, 2009

Season to season
2013–14: 4th (First Division)
2014–15: 8th (First Division)
2015–16: 3rd (First Division)
2016–17: 8th (First Division)
2017–18: 7th (First Division)

Performance in CAF competitions
CAF Champions League: 5 appearances
2005 – Second Round
 ASC Diaraf – Fello Star 0–1, 2–1
Fello Star – JS Kabylie 1–0, 0–0
 Ajax Cape Town 2–2 (total) (2–3 pen.)
2007 – First Round
Fello Star –  Sporting Clube da Praia 1–0, – (withdrew)1
 Étoile du Sahel
2009 – Preliminary Round
2010 – Preliminary Round
2011 – Preliminary Round
 ASFA Yennenga
CAF Confederation Cup: 1 appearance
2005 – Group Stage
 King Faisal Babes
 FAR Rabat

1SC Praia did not visited Guinea due to the civil war and strife that occurred in the nation, the CAF awarded Fello Star 3–0

References
 Fello Star at soccerway.com

External links
 Tables
 Continental Tournaments

Football clubs in Guinea
1988 establishments in Guinea